The 2017–18 Colorado Avalanche season was the 23rd operational season and 22nd playing season since the franchise relocated from Quebec prior to the start of the 1995–96 NHL season. As well as the franchise's 39th season in the National Hockey League and 46th season overall. After finishing the previous season in last place with just 48 points (21 points behind the next worst team), the Avalanche clinched the playoffs for the first time since the 2013–14 season.

Standings

Schedule and results

Preseason
The preseason schedule was released on June 13, 2017.

Regular season
The regular season schedule was published on June 22, 2017.

Playoffs

Player statistics
Final Stats

Skaters

Goaltenders

†Denotes player spent time with another team before joining the Avalanche. Stats reflect time with the Avalanche only.
‡Traded mid-season
Bold/italics denotes franchise record

Suspensions/fines

Transactions
The Avalanche have been involved in the following transactions during the 2017–18 season.

Trades

Free agents acquired

Free agents lost

Claimed via waivers

Lost via waivers

Players released

Lost via retirement

Player signings

Draft picks

Below are the Colorado Avalanche's selections at the 2017 NHL Entry Draft, which was held on June 23 and 24, 2017 at the United Center in Chicago.

Draft notes
 The New York Rangers' fourth-round pick went to the Colorado Avalanche as the result of a trade on June 25, 2016 that sent Nick Holden to New York in exchange for this pick.

References

Colorado Avalanche seasons
Colorado Avalanche
Colorado Avalanche
Colorado Avalanche